Dead Letter Dept., formerly known as The Stiffs, are a Canadian punk band from Toronto, Canada. The band consists of Rob Moir - (Guitar/vocals), Mike Leblanc - (Drums), Andrew Sparks - (Bass), Danny Complex - (Guitars). The band announced their break up on their Myspace blog in 2008. Their songs are mainly about girls and relationship with the occasional political song. Their last release was Rock n' Roll Hates You, which was released in 2005 by Underground Operations.

Discography
1996: The Stiffs - s/t cassette (independent release)
1997: The Stiffs - Dumb Songs About Dumb Girls cassette (independent release)
1998: The Stiffs, No One Knows. 8 song cassette (independent release)
1999: The Stiffs, Forever In A Day. 11 song CD (Ductape Records)
2001: Dead Letter Dept. EP (Ductape Records)
2002: split release with "Left Behind"  7" (Say-Ten Records)
2003: Anthology UK (Noo Noo Records)
2005: All My Friends Love Freedom + Yes You Can't EP (Mongoose Records)
2005: Rock n' Roll Hates You (Underground Operations)

References

External links
Dead Letter Dept. at Myspace
Dead Letter Dept. at CBC Radio 3
Dead Letter Dept at Exclaim!
Dead Letter Dept at punknews

Musical groups established in 1996
Musical groups disestablished in 2000
Musical groups reestablished in 2001
Musical groups disestablished in 2008
Musical groups from Toronto
Canadian punk rock groups
1996 establishments in Ontario
2000 disestablishments in Ontario
2001 establishments in Ontario
2008 disestablishments in Ontario